Laury is a surname and a given name. Notable people with the name include:

Surname:
Booker T. Laury (1914–1995), American boogie-woogie, blues, gospel and jazz pianist and singer
David Laury (born 1990), American basketball player
Jean Ray Laury (1928–2011), American artist and designer
Lance Laury (born 1982), American football player
Lisa Thomas-Laury (born 1954), news anchor in Philadelphia, Pennsylvania, US
Véronique Laury (born 1965), French businesswoman, CEO of UK-based retail group Kingfisher

Given name:
William Laury Greene (1849–1899), Nebraska Populist politician
Laury Haytayan, Lebanese oil & gas expert in the Middle East and North Africa
Laury Thilleman (born 1991), French journalist, model, TV Host, actress, Miss France 2011